Francine Vicki Golde, better known as Franne Golde or Frannie Golde, is an American songwriter, musician, singer and writer. Her songs have appeared on more than 100 million records sold worldwide. Golde has received BMI awards for singles with The Pussycat Dolls "Stickwitu", Randy Travis’s "A Man Ain't Made of Stone", The Kinleys' "Somebody's Out There Watching" from the Touched by an Angel soundtrack, Selena’s "Dreaming of You", Jody Watley’s "Don't You Want Me" and "Nightshift" by the Commodores, which also won a Grammy for Best R&B Performance by a Duo or Group and received a Grammy nomination for Song of the Year. Most recently, Golde has started her own clothing line known for creating "The Perfect Black Pant."

Biography

Early career
Early in her career, Golde found a home away from home in a rented studio at the Chess Records in Chicago. Her teachers were the R&B artists, producers and songwriters who recorded there and took Golde under their wing. She soon formed her first band, Frannie and Zoey, which received local acclaim, and she began recording for Atlantic and later Epic/Portrait.

In the early 1970s, Golde began writing with songwriter Carole Bayer Sager, who introduced her to Richard Perry. He was impressed with Golde and convinced her to move to Los Angeles and signed her to his publishing company Braintree Music. Soon after Diana Ross cut "Gettin' Ready for Love", the first song Golde co-wrote with Tom Snow, under her new deal with Perry. The Top 10 international hit graced Ross album, Baby It's Me.

Golde also wrote the Dennis Edwards/Siedah Garrett duet, "Don't Look Any Further" with Dennis Lambert and Duane Hitchings, which has since become one of the most frequently sampled tracks by rappers and dance artists internationally, including Snoop Dogg, TLC, Tupac Shakur, Junior M.A.F.I.A. with Notorious B.I.G., Lauryn Hill and M People, who recorded the song and made it a hit for the fourth time in the UK. Saxophonist Dave Koz gave it a jazz interpretation on Lucky Man and Michelin Tires tapped it for commercial advertising.

Album work
Golde's work has been featured on some of the biggest soundtrack hits of the past decade, including the Grammy Award–winning The Bodyguard, and the soundtracks for Top Gun, Beverly Hills Cop II, Selena (the biopic) which featured Golde's hit single "Dreaming of You" and the television series Miami Vice and Touched by an Angel, which included the country hit single Somebody's Out There Watching.

Kenny G recorded Golde's "Even if My Heart Would Break" with Aaron Neville for The Bodyguard soundtrack. He then chose to include it on his own release, Breathless. It marked only the third time in chart history that the same song appeared on both the No. 1 and No. 2 albums.

She has written songs on many albums including: Pussycat Dolls "Stickwitu" — which was also a worldwide hit single and was nominated for a 2007 Grammy Award for Best Pop Performance by a Duo or Group — Jessica Simpson "Be", Christina Aguilera's "So Emotional" and her Grammy Award-winning Latin CD Mi Reflejo with "El Beso Del Final", Jody Watley’s "Don’t You Want Me", Whitney Houston’s "I Belong to You", The Commodores' "Nightshift" and Selena's "Dreaming of You".

Current career
Golde recently opened an online boutique. She sits on the Board of Directors of Music Mends Minds, is a member of the Women's Alzheimer's Movement and has been honored as an "Architect Of Change" by Maria Shriver.

Personal life
Golde and record producer Paul Fox—who himself was diagnosed with early-onset Alzheimer's Disease in 2013—have been married since 1988.

Discography

Releases
 Frannie Golde (1976)
 Frannie (1979)
 "Here I Go Fallin' In Love Again" / "Tell Me What's Goin' On" (1979)
 Restless (1980)

Production
 Club Paradise (Original Motion Picture Soundtrack), "Love People" (1986)
 Modern Girls (Original Motion Picture Soundtrack), "Girls Night Out" (1986)
 In This Skin (Jessica Simpson), "Everyday See You" and "Be" (2003)

Appeared on
 Baby It's Me (Diana Ross), "Gettin' Ready For Love" (1977)
 Stay With Me Baby (Kiki Dee), "Holding Me Too Tight" (1978)
 Moonlight Madness (Teri DeSario), "Hold On, Hold On" (1979)
 Take A Bite (Marlena Shaw), "Shaw Biz/Suddenly It's How I Like To Feel/Shaw Bizz (Reprise)" (1979)
 When Love Comes Calling (Deniece Williams), "God Knows" (1979)
 Rock Me Up A Mountain / Sinner At Sunday (Anita Meijer), "Rock Me Up A Mountain Ariola Benelux" (1980)
 I Got The Melody (Odyssey), "Baby That's All I Want" (1981)
 Katie Kissoon (Katie Kissoon), "God Knows" (1981)
 Right On Time (Margriet Eshuijs album), "Girl On The Radio" (1981)
 Secret Combination (Randy Crawford), "Secret Combination" (1981)
 Get Nervous (Pat Benatar), "Looking For A Stranger" (1982)
Cool Kids (Kix) "Cool Kids" (1983)
 Diana Ross Anthology (Diana Ross), "Gettin' Ready For Love" (1983)
 Live from Earth (Pat Benatar), "Looking For A Stranger" (1983)
 Lucky (Marty Balin), "All We Really Need" (1983)
 Over My Head (Toni Basil) (1983)
 Ross (Diana Ross), "Let's Go Up" (1983)
 The Very Best Of Diana Ross - Anthology (Diana Ross), "Gettin' Ready For Love" (1983)
 Don't Look Any Further (Dennis Edwards), "Don't Look Any Further" (1984)
 Nightshift (Commodores), "Nightshift" (1984)
 Toni Basil (Toni Basil), "Over My Head" and "Spacewalkin' The Dog" (1984)
 Bit By Bit (Theme From "Fletch") (Stephanie Mills/Harold Faltermeyer), "Bit By Bit" (1985)
 High Class Disco (Compilation), "Nightshift" (1985)
 Janet (Commodores), "Janet" (1985)
 Miami Vice - Music From The Television Series (Compilation), "Own The Night" (1985)
 Nightshift (Winston Groovy), "Nightshift" (1985)
 Own The Night (Chaka Khan), "Own The Night" (1985)
 Ronny's Pop Show (Compilation), "Nightshift" (1985)
 The Collector (Cerrone), "The Collector Part II" (1985)
 The Most Beautiful Love Songs 2 (Compilation), "Nightshift" (1985)
 A Lot Of Love (Melba Moore), "Falling" (1986)
 Goin' To The Bank (Commodores), "Goin' To The Bank" (1986)
 Hot Summer Nights (Miami Sound Machine) (single), "Destination Unknown" (1986)
 Talk To Me (Chico DeBarge), "Talk To Me" (1986)
 Top Gun - Original Motion Picture Soundtrack (Compilation), "Destination Unknown" (1986)
 Touch Me In The Morning / Baby It's Me (Diana Ross), "Gettin' Ready For Love" (1986)
 Beverly Hills Cop II - Original Motion Picture Soundtrack, (Pointer Sisters), "Be There" (1987)
 Jody Watley (self-titled), "Don't You Want Me" (1987)
 I Stand Alone (Agnetha Faltskog), "We Got A Way" (1987)
 Miracle (The Kane Gang), "Don't Look Any Further" (1987)
 The Love Songs (Randy Crawford), "Secret Combination" (1987)
 Aftershock (Average White Band), "Aftershock" (1988)
 Eighties Lady / Generate Love (Gwen McCrae), "Generate Love" (1988)
 Fearless (Eighth Wonder), "Wild Love" (1988)
 I'm Into Something Good (Peter Noone), "God Knows" (1988)
 Shock To My System (Roberta Flack), "Shock To My System" (1988)
 Time For Fantasy (Amii Stewart), "Stand" (1988)
 If I Could Turn Back Time (single) (Cher), "Some Guys" (1989)
 Never Enough (The Highlanders), "Never Enough" (1989)
 100 Dance Hits Of The Eighties (Compilation), "Goin' To The Bank" (1990)
 30th Anniversary The Motown Legend (Compilation), "Nightshift" (1990)
 Don't Look Any Further/Is It In/Dance Across The Floor (Dennis Edwards/Jimmy "Bo" Horne), "Don't Look Any Further" (1990)
 Glenn Medeiros (Glenn Medeiros), "Me - U = Blue" (1990)
 "I Belong To You" (Whitney Houston) (1991)
 Cereal Killers (Too Much Joy) (1991)
 Breathless (Kenny G), "Even If My Heart Would Break" (1992)
 Commodores Hits Vol. I & II (Commodores), "Nightshift" and "Goin'To The Bank" (1992)
 Restless Heart (Peter Cetera), "Dip Your Wings" (1992)
 The Bodyguard: Original Soundtrack Album (Compilation), "Even If My Heart Would Break" (1992)
 El Guardaespaldas (Banda De Sonido Original), "Even If My Heart Would Break" (1992)
 All That Matters To Me (Alexander O'Neal), "All That Matters To Me" (1993)
 Don't Look Any Further (M People), "Don't Look Any Further" (1993)
 Only Sisters Can Do That (Pointer Sisters), "Tell It To My Heart" (1993)
 Elegant Slumming (M People), "Don't Look Any Further" (1993)
 Run To You (Whitney Houston) (1993)
 Soul On Board (Curt Smith), "Soul On Board" (1993)
 Dance To The Max 2 (Compilation), "Don't Look Any Further" (1994)
 Motown Blend (Compilation), "Don't Look Any Further" (1994)
 Sounds Of The Eighties - 1985 (Compilation) "Nightshift" (1994)
 Dreaming Of You (Selena), "Dreaming Of You" (1995)
 Funkology Volume Two / Behind The Groove (Compilation), "Don't Look Any Further" (1995)
 Let The Music Play (Compilation), "Don't Look Any Further" (1995)
 Mickey! (The Best Of Toni Basil) (Toni Basil), "Over My Head" and "Spacewalkin' The Dog" (1995)
 This Is It - The Best Of Melba Moore (Melba Moore), "Falling" (1995)
 Heartbreaker - Sixteen Classic Performances (Pat Benatar), "Looking For A Stranger" (1996)
 La Légende Des Tubes Volume 4 (Compilation), "Nightshift" (1996)
 La Légende Des Tubes Volume 18 (Compilation), "Don't Look Any Further" (1997)
 Reggae Fieber (Compilation), "Nightshift" (1997)
 The Very Of Toni Basil (Compilation), "Over My Head" and "Spacewalkin' The Dog" (1997)
 Hands On Motown (Compilation), "On The Nightshift" (1998)
 On The Nightshift (G's Incorporated), "On The Nightshift" (1998)
 The Best Of M People (M People), "Don't Look Any Further" (1998)
 Somebody's Out There Watching (The Kinleys), "Somebody's Out There Watching" (1998)
 Touched By An Angel: The Album (Compilation), "Somebody's Out There Watching" (1998)
 Perfect Moment (Martine McCutcheon), "Gettin' Ready For Love" (1999)
 Planet Freestyle ∙ Volume 4 (Compilation), "Want Me" (1999)
 What A Girl Wants (Christina Aguilera), "So Emotional" (1999)
 A Man Ain't Made of Stone (Randy Travis), "A Man Ain't Made of Stone" (1999)
 Mega Dance Hits 2000 (Compilation), "Want Me" (2000)
 Hollands Glorie - Gordon (Gordon), "Echte Liefde (Gaat Nooit Voorbij)" (2001)
 Love This Way (Eden's Crush), "Love This Way" (2001)
 Classic Masters (Compilation), "Looking For A Stranger" (2002)
 Around The World (Hind), "Don't Look Any Further" (2003)
 From Tha Church To Da Palace (Snoop Dogg), "Paper'd Up" (2003)
 Greatest Hits (Selena), "Dreaming Of You" (2003)
 La Cabala - The Mysterious Room (Andrea T. Mendoza), "Don't Look Any Further" (2003)
 Re Notes - Remixes (Fried Pride), "Louisiana Sunday Afternoon" (2003)
 Culture Club Volume 4 (Compilation), "Nightshift" (2005)
 Don't Look Any Further / If You Should Ever Be Lonely (Dennis Edwards/Val Young), "Don't Look Any Further" (2005)
 Greatest Hits (Pat Benatar), "Looking For A Stranger" (2005)
 Renaissance: The Classics (Compilation), "Don't Look Any Further" (2005)
 Ultimate Collection (Compilation), "Don't Look Any Further" (2005)
 PCD (Pussycat Dolls), "Stickwitu" (2005)
 Nina'' (Nina), "Where Is Love" (2006)
 '80s Dance: Gold (Compilation), "Don't Look Any Further" (2006)
 Living With War (Neil Young), "Living With War" (2006)
 12"/80s Grooves (Compilation), "Don't Look Any Further" (2007)
 Années 80 Hits-Box (Compilation), "Don't Look Any Further" (2007)
 Ghetto Rose (Keke Wyatt), "Ghetto Rose" (2007)
 The Journey (Jessica Mauboy), "Stickwitu" (2007)
 R&B Love Collection 2008 (Compilation), "Stickwitu" (2008)
 DJ Samir Presents Motown Magic (Compilation), "Don't Look Any Further" (2009)
 I Look To You (Whitney Houston), "Nothin' But Love" (2009)
 "Lose To Win" Fantasia Barrino, "Side Effects Of You"

References

Living people
American women singers
Songwriters from Illinois
Singers from Chicago
21st-century American women
1952 births